Ophrys scolopax, known as the woodcock bee-orchid or woodcock orchid, is a species of terrestrial orchid found around the Mediterranean and the Middle East, from Morocco and Portugal to Hungary and Iran.

Description 
Ophrys scolopax grows from underground tubers. Leaves typically start to appear above ground in late autumn and are often beginning to yellow by the time the flowers appear, which in the case of O. scolopax is between March and June in their native habitats. The number of flowers is equally variable, with as few as two or as many as 15 or even more. Each flower has the standard structure for the genus. There are three outer sepals which may be lighter or darker shades of green or violet, the lightest appearing white. The upper (dorsal) sepal varies from flat to boat-shaped and is bent backwards at the base and then curves forwards. Inside the sepals are three petals, two lateral petals and the lip.

The lip (labellum) has a complex three-dimensional shape and is strongly patterned. It is divided at the base into three lobes, each of which is rolled up so that from the front there appear to be three tubes. The outer sides of the side lobes are hairy; the margins of the central lobe are velvety. The rest of the surface of the lobes is smooth. The background colour of the lip is some shade of brown. The speculum is H- or X-shaped or even more complicated, usually a dull blue to violet in colour with a pale yellow border.

Subspecies 
A rather long list of varieties, forms, and subspecies have been proposed for this species. As of May 2014, the following such names are recognized:

Ophrys scolopax subsp. apiformis (Desf.) Maire & Weiller – Spain, Portugal, Sardinia, Sicily, Tunisia, Algeria, and Morocco
Ophrys scolopax subsp. conradiae (Melki & Deschâtres) H.Baumann & al. – Corsica, Sardinia, and Italy
Ophrys scolopax subsp. cornuta (Steven) E.G.Camus – Hungary, Apulia, the Balkans, Crimea, Turkey, and the Caucasus
Ophrys scolopax subsp. heldreichii (Schltr.) E.Nelson – Greece, Turkey, and Apulia
Ophrys scolopax var. minutula (Gölz & H.R.Reinhard) H.A.Pedersen & Faurh – Turkey, Greek islands
Ophrys scolopax subsp. rhodia (H.Baumann & Künkele) H.A.Pedersen & Faurh. – Greek islands
Ophrys scolopax subsp. scolopax – from Portugal to Iran

References

Bibliography 

scolopax
Orchids of Europe
Flora of North Africa
Flora of Western Asia
Plants described in 1793
Taxa named by Antonio José Cavanilles